Romeo Macusi Acop (born March 11, 1947) is a Filipino politician who served as Representative for Antipolo's 2nd District from 2010 to 2019, and again in 2022.

Early life and career at the PNP
He attended the Philippine Military Academy, graduating in the 1970 Magiting batch with Hermogenes E. Ebdane, Jr., a Governor of Zambales. He then studied law at the José Rizal University, graduating cum laude in 1986. Acop then served in the Philippine National Police as Chief Superintendent, which was equivalent to a brigadier general, during the Ramos government. In response to the resignation of Panfilo Lacson as PNP Chief in January 2001, Acop, with two other prominent police officers, resigned their posts.

Electoral performance

Philippine general elections, 2010
In 2010, the elections were held for seats in the House of Representatives. The 2nd District of Antipolo was contested by eight competitors, including former Rizal Vice-Governor Jestoni Alarcon. Still, Acop triumphed the race with 32,281 votes (31.36% of the vote) with Lorenzo Sumulong III following with 24,907 votes (24.20%). Alarcon was third with 20,159 votes (19.59%).

Philippine general elections, 2013
In 2013, the elections were held for seats in the House of Representatives. The Second District of Antipolo was contested by three competitors, including former Antipolo Councilor Lorenzo Sumulong III, who also contested the position three years back. Acop won a fresh term with 74,109 votes (61.79% of the vote) with Lorenzo Sumulong III following with 44,612 votes (37.20%). Bulanon was third with 1,217 votes (1.01%).

Philippine general elections, 2016
In 2016, the elections were held for seats in the House of Representatives. Acop ran unopposed for the 2nd District of Antipolo. Acop easily gained his third and final constitutional term with 128,309 votes.

Philippine general elections, 2019
In 2019, the elections were held for the seats in the House of Representatives. Acop was term-limited, and therefore could not run for a fourth term. His wife, Resurreccion Marrero Acop, ran in his stead, unopposed. She garnered 127,695 votes, and took office on June 30 that same year.

Philippine general elections, 2019
Acop was elected to his fourth term as representative in 2022, unopposed.

Career as Representative
Acop served his third three-year term as representative from 2016 to 2019. Acop was a member of eleven committees in the Philippine Congress, namely: Public Order and Safety (as Chairman), Appropriations, Health, Higher and Technical Education, Local Government, National Cultural Communities, Public Works and Highways, Southern Tagalog Development, Transportation, Veterans Affairs and Welfare and West Philippine Sea. Acop authored or co-authored 63 House bills to date.

He was one of the 56 representatives in the 16th Congress of the Philippines (out of 290 members) with a perfect attendance record.

References

1947 births
Living people
Filipino police officers
Members of the House of Representatives of the Philippines from Antipolo
National Unity Party (Philippines) politicians
People from Antipolo
Philippine Military Academy alumni
José Rizal University alumni